Jaakko Kalela (born 24 January 1944, in Helsinki) is a Finnish civil servant and ambassador. He worked for 33 years as Assistant to the President of the Republic (first Foreign Policy Adviser, later Permanent Secretary) and moved as Ambassador to Tallinn in 2005.

Jaakko Kalela's grandfather was Prime Minister Aimo Cajander.

References 

Diplomats from Helsinki
1944 births
Living people
Recipients of the Order of the Cross of Terra Mariana, 1st Class
Recipients of the Order of the Cross of Terra Mariana, 2nd Class
Recipients of the Order of the White Star, 1st Class